Elemér Somfay (28 August 1898 – 15 May 1979) was a Hungarian athlete who competed mainly in the pentathlon.

He competed for a Hungary at the 1924 Summer Olympics held in Paris, France in the Pentathlon where he won the silver medal. He also competed in the modern pentathlon at the 1932 Summer Olympics.

References

1898 births
1979 deaths
Hungarian heptathletes
Hungarian male modern pentathletes
Olympic modern pentathletes of Hungary
Olympic silver medalists for Hungary
Athletes (track and field) at the 1924 Summer Olympics
Modern pentathletes at the 1932 Summer Olympics
Olympic athletes of Hungary
Medalists at the 1924 Summer Olympics
Olympic silver medalists in athletics (track and field)
Olympic decathletes
Athletes from Budapest
19th-century Hungarian people
20th-century Hungarian people